This is the complete list of Pan American medalists in roller sports.

Artistic roller skating

Men's

Free skating

Figure skating

Long Program

Women's

Free skating

Figure skating

Long Program

Mixed

Pairs

Dance

Roller speed skating

Men's

200 metres

Time Trial

300 metres

Time Trial

Road

Track

500 metres

Pair elimination

Road

Track

1000 metres

1500 metres

Road

Track

3000 metres

Mass start

5000 metres

Mass start

10000 metres

Road

Track

Points + elimination

10000 metres relay

20000 metres

Road

Track

Combined Short Distance

Combined Long Distance

Marathon

Women's

200 metres

Time Trial

300 metres

Time Trial

500 metres

Pair elimination

Road

Track

1000 metres

1500 metres

Road

Track

2000 metres

Points

3000 metres

Mass start

5000 metres

Road

Track

5000 metres relay

10000 metres

Road

Track

Points + elimination

Combined Short Distance

Combined Long Distance

Half Marathon

Roller hockey

Men's

References

Roller sports
Medalists